Vishwabharati is a school in Ahmedabad in the state of Gujarat in India. The school was established in 1963.

Schools in Gujarat
Educational institutions established in 1963
1963 establishments in Gujarat
Ahmedabad district